The 1933 Lehigh Engineers football team was an American football team that represented Lehigh University during the 1933 college football season. In its sixth and final season under head coach A. Austin Tate, the team compiled a 2–6 record, and lost both games against its Middle Three Conference rivals.  

The team played its home games at Taylor Stadium in Bethlehem, Pennsylvania.

Schedule

References

Lehigh
Lehigh Mountain Hawks football seasons
Lehigh Engineers football